Chartley Moss is a 105.80 hectare biological Site of Special Scientific Interest in Staffordshire, notified in 1987. The area has been designated as an Area of Outstanding Natural Beauty, a Ramsar Convention protected  wetland site, and a national nature reserve. There is no access without a permit.

In 1995 Chartley Moss was twinned with Tsukigaumi Mire, Hokkaido, in a gesture of goodwill between scientists from Hokkaido University and the University of Nottingham.

See also
List of Sites of Special Scientific Interest in Staffordshire

References

External links
Chartley Moss designated site information (Natural England)

Bogs of England
Landforms of Staffordshire
Nature reserves in Staffordshire
Sites of Special Scientific Interest in Staffordshire
Sites of Special Scientific Interest notified in 1987